Galli–Galli disease is a rare inherited condition that has close resemblance clinically to Dowling-Degos' disease, but is histologically distinct, characterized by skin lesions that are 1- to 2-mm slightly keratotic red to dark brown papules which are focally confluent in a reticulate pattern.  The disease is also characterized by slowly progressive and disfiguring reticulate hyperpigmentation of the flexures, clinically and histopathologically diagnostic for Dowling-Degos disease but also associated with suprabasal, nondyskeratotic acantholysis.

See also
 List of cutaneous conditions
 Skin lesion

References

Disturbances of human pigmentation